Zürich Opera (Oper Zürich) is a Swiss opera company based in Zürich. The company gives performances in the Zürich Opera House.

History
The first performance at the current theatre occurred on 30 September 1891, with a production of Wagner's Lohengrin. Wilhelm Furtwängler began his career there, and in 1913 Richard Wagner’s Parsifal was given its first performance outside Bayreuth. Ferruccio Busoni, Paul Hindemith, Richard Strauss, Othmar Schoeck, Arthur Honegger, Frank Martin and other famous composers all left their mark on the development of Zürich's musical theatre. Zürich Opera House has been the setting for numerous world premières, such as Alban Berg’s Lulu, Paul Hindemith’s Mathis der Maler, Arnold Schönberg’s Moses und Aron, and Rudolf Kelterborn's Der Kirschgarten. Works by Heinrich Sutermeister and Giselher Klebe were also performed there for the first time.

From 1975 to 1986, Claus Helmut Drese was artistic director of the company. His artistic standards led the company to gain international recognition, through the presentation of the Monteverdi cycle, with Nikolaus Harnoncourt as conductor and Jean-Pierre Ponnelle as director and set designer.

In the 1991/1992 season, Alexander Pereira became Intendant (general director) of the company. His tenure opened with Lohengrin in a production by Robert Wilson. He has placed great emphasis on promoting promising young artists and new types of performances. Pereira initiated the Zürich Festival in the autumn of 1996, with the first festival held in the summer of 1997.

The current Intendant of the company is Andreas Homoki, since 2012. During Homoki's tenure, Fabio Luisi served as Generalmusikdirektor (GMD) of the company. In July 2018, Zürich Opera announced simultaneously the extension of Homoki's contract as Intendant through 2025, the scheduled conclusion of Luisi's tenure as GMD after the 2020/2021 season, and the appointment of Gianandrea Noseda as the next GMD of the company, effective in 2021.  In October 2022, the company announced an extension of Noseda's contract as GMD with the company through the 2027-2028 season.

Conductors in leadership positions (partial list)
 Nello Santi (GMD, 1958–1969)
 Ferdinand Leitner ('Musikalischer Oberleiter', 1969–1984)
 Ralf Weikert (chief conductor, 1985–1992)
 Franz Welser-Möst (chief conductor, 1995–2005; GMD, 2005–2008).
 Daniele Gatti (chief conductor, 2009–2012)
 Fabio Luisi (GMD, 2012–2021)
 Gianandrea Noseda (GMD, 2021–present)

References

External links
 Official website of Opernhaus Zürich
 Philharmonia Zürich
 Interview with Marc Belfort (former director of the International Opera Center at the Zürich Opera), by Bruce Duffie, 19 May 1987

Swiss opera companies